Lajos Dinnyés (16 April 1901 – 3 May 1961) was a Hungarian politician of the Smallholders Party who served as the last pre-communist Prime Minister of Hungary from 1947 to 1948.

Biography
He came from a well to do titled family and finished high school at Budapest Reformed Gimnazium.  He finished studies at Keszthely Academy, earning a degree in agriculture. Following his father's death he looked after the family property in 1930.

He became a member of the Agrarian Party in 1929, subsequently representing the Smallholders Party after their merger in 1930. Between 1931 and 1938, he served as a Member of Parliament representing Alsódabas.

He married in 1941, held a civil post and served for a short term in the army. He returned to public life in 1945 when the Smallholders Party was reformed.

In March 1947, he became Minister of Defence in the government of Ferenc Nagy, the leader of the Smallholders Party. When Soviet-backed communists forced the Prime Minister into exile on 30 May 1947, Dinnyés was appointed as successor. In the so-called "Blue Papers Election" on 31 August 1947, the Smallholders Party came in second surpassed by the Communists. Dinnyés remained in office as Prime Minister until 1948, but merely served as an obedient puppet in the hands of the deputy premier, Communist Party boss Mátyás Rákosi. While Dinnyés nominally headed the government, Rákosi laid the foundations of the communist dictatorship by nationalizing factories, banks and denominational schools. In December 1948, the Communists used the emigration of the treasurer Miklós Nyárádi as an excuse to push out Dinnyés altogether and replace him with the fellow traveller István Dobi.

He later became the director of the National Library of Agriculture and vice president of Parliament. During the Hungarian Revolution of 1956 he was a member of the Interim National Assembly.

References
 Sulinet – Lajos Dinnyés biography

1901 births
1961 deaths
People from Dabas, Hungary
People from the Kingdom of Hungary
Independent Smallholders, Agrarian Workers and Civic Party politicians
Prime Ministers of Hungary
Defence ministers of Hungary
Members of the House of Representatives (Hungary)
Members of the National Assembly of Hungary (1945–1947)
Members of the National Assembly of Hungary (1947–1949)
Members of the National Assembly of Hungary (1949–1953)
Members of the National Assembly of Hungary (1953–1958)
Members of the National Assembly of Hungary (1958–1963)